Ravensworth is a village and civil parish in the Richmondshire district of North Yorkshire, England.

Ravensworth may also refer to:

Places
 Ravensworth, Queensland, Australia
 Ravensworth, Ontario, Canada
 Crosby Ravensworth, Cumbria, England
 Ravensworth Castle, Lamesley, Tyne and Wear, England
 Ravensworth, Virginia, United States

Other uses
 Ravensworth (plantation), a historic house and plantation near Annandale in Fairfax County, Virginia
 Baron Ravensworth

See also
 Ravensworth Castle (disambiguation)